Bourgeois pseudoscience was a term of condemnation in the Soviet Union for certain scientific disciplines that were deemed unacceptable from an ideological point of view due to their incompatibility with Marxism–Leninism. For example, genetics was not acceptable due to the role of random mutations of an individual organism in evolution, which was perceived as incompatible with the "universal laws of history" that applied to masses universally, as postulated by the Marxist ideology. At various times pronounced "bourgeois pseudosciences" were: genetics, cybernetics, quantum physics, theory of relativity, sociology and particular directions in comparative linguistics (Japhetic theory). This attitude was most prevalent during the rule of Joseph Stalin.

Notably, the term was not used by Stalin himself, who rejected the notion that science can have a class nature. Stalin removed all mention of “bourgeois biology” from Trofim Lysenko’s report, The State of Biology in the Soviet Union, and in the margin next to the statement that “any science is based on class” Stalin wrote, “Ha-ha-ha!! And what about mathematics? Or Darwinism?” The term was mostly used by Stalinist philosophers, such as Mark Moisevich Rosenthal and Pavel Yudin, who use it in the 1951 and 1954 editions of their Short Philosophical Dictionary: "Eugenics is a bourgeois pseudoscience", "Weismannism-Morganism - bourgeois pseudoscience, designed to justify capitalism".

Psychology was declared "bourgeois pseudoscience" in People's Republic of China during the Cultural Revolution (1966-1976). Sociology was banned in PRC in 1952, and it remained banned for over 30 years.

See also
 Suppressed research in the Soviet Union
 Cybernetics in the Soviet Union
 Censorship in the Soviet Union
 Soviet historiography

Notes

References

Political repression in the Soviet Union
Soviet phraseology
Science and technology in the Soviet Union
Politics of science
Anti-intellectualism